John Tennant may refer to:

John Tennant (bushranger), Australian bushranger
John Tennant (footballer, born 1939) (1939–1985), English football goalkeeper
John Tennant (RAF officer) (1890–1941), British airman, explorer, banker and politician
John Tennant (pastoralist)
John Tennant (politician), British politician and MEP
Jack Tennant (John William Tennant, 1907–1978), English football defender

See also
John Tennent (disambiguation)